The Johnson County School District is a public school district in Johnson County, Georgia, United States, based in Wrightsville. It serves the communities of Adrian, Kite, and Wrightsville.

Schools
The Johnson County School District has one elementary school, one middle school, and one high school.

Elementary school
Johnson County Elementary School

Middle school
Johnson County Middle School

High school
Johnson County High School

References

External links

School districts in Georgia (U.S. state)
Education in Johnson County, Georgia